"Overjoyed" is a song by American alternative rock band Matchbox Twenty. It was released on August 28, 2012, as the second single from their fourth studio album, North. A music video was released for "Overjoyed" on November 2, 2012.

Music video
The official music video was uploaded to YouTube on November 2, 2012. The music video shows Rob Thomas and the rest of the band performing the song at a fair. In the beginning, you see a young woman getting ready and an older woman also putting on make up. They both meet their "date" at a fair. Throughout the video, you see couples from various time periods enjoy the merry-go-round, games, and go-karts. The couples get their pictures taken, and the ending shows that this is the same couple from different periods ranging from 1959 to 2012.

Charts

References

2012 singles
Matchbox Twenty songs
Songs written by Rob Thomas (musician)
Songs written by Paul Doucette
Songs written by Kyle Cook
2012 songs
Atlantic Records singles
Rock ballads